Edgar Norfolk (5 November 1893 – 1980) was a British actor.

Norfolk was born Edgar Greenwood. He was the first husband of the actress Helen Saintsbury (a daughter of the actor H.A. Saintsbury); her second husband, Captain Buckley Rutherford, a son of Sir Ernest Rutherford (a wine importer, not the physicist Ernest Rutherford, although they were both born in 1871 and are sometimes confused). Four months after Saintsbury's wedding to Rutherford, he shot himself and, distraught, less than a month later, Saintsbury also shot herself.

Filmography

References

External links

1893 births
1980 deaths
Date of death unknown
English male film actors
Male actors from Yorkshire
Male actors from Bradford